Schweizerische Aktionskomitee für Frauenstimmrecht (Swiss Action Committee for Women's Suffrage ), was a women's organization in Switzerland, founded in 1945.  

It was one of the main women's suffrage organisations in Switzerland, during the last decades before the introduction of women's suffrage in 1971. It was established in 1945 as an opinion-forming instrument.

References 

Women's suffrage in Switzerland
Feminist organisations in Switzerland
1945 establishments
Political organisations based in Switzerland
Organizations established in 1945
Voter rights and suffrage organizations
1945 in women's history